Bonnat may refer to:

 Bonnat, Creuse, a commune in France
 Canton of Bonnat, Creuse, France
 Bonnat Chocolates, a French chocolate manufacturer
 Félix Bonnat (1921–2013), French Olympic bobsledder
 Léon Bonnat (1833–1922), a French painter
 Musée Bonnat, in Bayonne, Nouvelle-Aquitaine, France
 Zacarias Bonnat, Dominican Republican weightlifter; see List of Dominican Republic records in Olympic weightlifting